Crowhurst Place, Crowhurst, Surrey, England is a medieval hall house dating from the early 15th century. In the 20th century, the house was reconstructed and enlarged by George A. Crawley, firstly for himself and subsequently for Consuelo Vanderbilt, Duchess of Marlborough. It is a Grade I listed building.

History
The origins of Crowhurst Place are those of a traditional hall house of the early 15th century. It was built for the Gaynesfords, a family of wealthy yeomen. Ian Nairn, Nikolaus Pevsner and Bridget Cherry, in the 1971 revised Surrey Pevsner Buildings of England, give a construction date of circa. 1425. In the early 20th century, the estate was bought by George A. Crawley, a decorator and designer rather than a trained architect, who developed a small, but successful practice in reconstructing traditional buildings in a Tudor Revival style. Working firstly for himself, and subsequently for Consuelo Vanderbilt, Crawley greatly expanded the original medieval hall house. The result, "remarkable in its own right", saw Crawley add extensions, chimneys, gables, linenfold panelling and large amounts of half-timbering. Life at Crowhurst in the early stages of reconstruction was not without its challenges. Crawley's friend, and biographer, the politician Cuthbert Headlam, recorded the first Christmas celebrated at the house, in his memoir of Crawley. Guests were obliged to huddle together for warmth in front of the fireplace in the great hall, as drifts of snow gusted in through large cracks in the building's frame. Ultimately, the discomfort proved too great for Crawley's wife, and the house was sold to Consuelo Vanderbilt in 1910.

Consuelo Vanderbilt, great-granddaughter, of Commodore Cornelius Vanderbilt, had married the 9th Duke of Marlborough in 1895. The marriage brought status and social position to the Vanderbilts, and money to the Marlboroughs, but happiness to neither Consuelo nor her husband. By 1906, they were living apart, although they did not divorce until 1921. In searching for a new home after her separation, Consuelo was drawn to Crowhurst Palace, its Tudor appearance a stark contrast to the Baroque grandeur of Blenheim Palace, a house she loathed. Crawley continued work on the house for its new owner, with ultimately over half the building being rebuilt or constructed afresh on old foundations, with the remainder being heavily restored. Consuelo remained at the house until 1921, when she moved to France following her second marriage to Jacques Balsan, an aviator and entrepreneur.

Martin Conway, writing in Country Life, considered Crawley's reconstruction gave the remains of the original manor, "a beauty far greater than was ever theirs in the days of its newness". Nairn, Pevsner and Cherry note the sense of escapism which inspired much of the Tudor Revival, calling Crowhurst, "an extreme example of the English flight from reality around the 1914-18 war".

Later owners of Crowhurst Place included Sir John Davis, Chairman of The Rank Organisation, and Adam Faith, the singer. As at 2020, the house was for sale.

Architecture and description
The house is approached over a drawbridge, which crosses a defensive moat. The original buildings comprise the central hall, with a single further chamber separated by a screens passage. The North and South wings are additions by Crawley, who also altered the roofline, adding a porch, an oriel window and an array of Tudoresque chimney stacks. The main block is of two storeys, with a six-bay frontage. The construction materials are timber, with brick and stone plinths and brick infilling.

Crowhurst Place is a Grade I listed building. The lodge, and a dovecot, are both by Crawley, date from around 1920 and are both listed Grade II. A granary and barn on the estate are 15th century in origin and are listed Grade II*, while another barn is later, of the 16th century, and is listed Grade II.

Notes

References

Sources
 
 
 
 
 
 
 
 

Country houses in Surrey
Grade I listed houses
Grade I listed buildings in Surrey